The 1967 Xavier Musketeers football team was an American football team that represented Xavier University as an independent during the 1967 NCAA University Division football season. In its sixth season under head coach Ed Biles, the team compiled a 6–3–1 record and was outscored by a total of 142 to 132.

Schedule

References

Xavier
Xavier Musketeers football seasons
Xavier Musketeers football